Kristijan is a given name. Notable people with the name include:

Kristijan Brčić (born 1987), Croatian football midfielder, plays for C.D. Nacional on loan from NK Inter Zaprešić
Kristijan Čaval (born 1978), Croatian football midfielder, currently playing for NK Slaven Belupo
Kristijan Dobras (born 1992), Australian football midfielder
Kristijan Đorđević (born 1976), retired Serbian footballer
Kristijan Golubović (born 1969), Serbian mafioso
Kristijan Ipša (born 1986), Croatian football defender, currently playing for FC Midtjylland
Kristijan Polovanec (born 1979), Croatian professional footballer who plays for FC Koper

See also 
 Christian (given name)

Croatian masculine given names
Serbian masculine given names